ZK-93423 is an anxiolytic drug from the β-Carboline family, closely related to abecarnil. It is a nonbenzodiazepine GABAA agonist which is not subtype selective and stimulates α1, α2, α3, and α5-subunit containing GABAA receptors equally. It has anticonvulsant, muscle relaxant and appetite stimulating properties comparable to benzodiazepine drugs. ZK-93423 has also been used as a base to develop new and improved beta-carboline derivatives and help map the binding site of the GABAA receptor.

See also
 ZK-93426

References 

Anxiolytics
Beta-Carbolines
Phenol ethers
Ethers
Carboxylate esters
Ethyl esters
GABAA receptor positive allosteric modulators